{{Infobox person
| name               = Vikram Singh Chauhan
| birth_date         = 
| birth_place        = Dehradun, Uttarakhand, India
|image               =
|caption             =
| occupation         = Actor
| years_active       = 2013–present
| spouse             = 
| children           = 1
|known for           = {{ubl|Jaana Na Dil Se Door|Ek Deewaana Tha|Yehh Jadu Hai Jinn Ka!}}
}}

Vikram Singh Chauhan is an Indian actor who mainly works in Hindi television. He made his acting debut with Qubool Hai portraying Imraan Qureshi in 2013. He is best known for his portrayal of Atharva Sujata in Jaana Na Dil Se Door, Vyom Bedi in Ek Deewaana Tha and Aman Junaid Khan in Yehh Jadu Hai Jinn Ka!.

Chauhan made his film debut in 2015 with The Perfect Girl and also worked in Mardaani 2. He made his web debut with Baarish in 2019.

Personal life
Chauhan was born and brought up in Dehradun. 

Chauhan married his longtime girlfriend Sneha Shukla, a corporate lawyer, on 27 April 2021 in his hometown Dehradun. The couple had their first child, a baby girl named Sia, on 2 May 2022.

Career
Chauhan made his debut in 2013 with Qubool Hai as Imran Qureshi. Next, he appeared in Million Dollar Girl and  Ek Hasina Thi.

From 2016 to 2017, he played Atharv Vashisht in Star Plus's Jaana Na Dil Se Door opposite Shivani Surve. From 2017 to 2018, he portrayed Vyom Bedi/Akash Khurana in Sony TV's Ek Deewaana Tha with Donal Bisht.

Since October 2019 to 2020, Chauhan had played the role of Aman Junaid Khan in Star Plus's Yehh Jadu Hai Jinn Ka! with Aditi Sharma. He also made a debut in Bollywood by playing the role of a cop in Rani Mukherjee starrer Mardaani 2, produced by Yash Raj Films. Most recently, Chauhan appeared in a web series Chattis aur Maina'' starring Sandeepa Dhar and others, which started streaming from 28 May on Disney+ Hotstar Quix.

Filmography

Films

Television

Web series

Awards and nominations

References

External links
 
 

Living people
21st-century Indian male actors
Indian male television actors
Actors from Dehradun
Year of birth missing (living people)